Zillah School District No. 205 is a public school district in Yakima County, Washington, United States, and serves the town of Zillah.

In May 2013 the district had an enrollment of 1,322. Zillah is one of the smallest districts in area in Yakima County (estimated 44 square miles). The estimated population within the school district boundaries is approximately 4,000.

Zillah is a bedroom community to Yakima. Business and industry in our district boundaries are: diversified agriculture (including fruit tree orchards, vineyards, dairies, row crops, forage crops, cattle feed lot, vegetable truck gardening, etc.) and agriculture related service industries including several diversified fruit packing and shipping operations, wineries, agriculture management and consulting, veterinarian, and USDA Soil Conservation Service. The Zillah School District is one of the top three employers in the community.

Primary schools
 Hilton Elementary School  houses grades K-3.  The current principal is Doug Burge. (http://www.zillahschools.org/HES)

Secondary schools
 Zillah Intermediate School  built in 1983, holds grades 4–6.  The current principal is Paula (Holden) Dasso.  (http://www.zillahschools.org/ZIS)
 Zillah Middle School  is for grades 7–8.  ZMS is the newest of the schools.  The current principal is Andy Boe.  (http://www.zillahschools.org/ZMS)
 Zillah High School (Home of the Leopards)  is run by principal Mike Torres and Assistant Principal Rock Winters.  It holds grades 9-12. (http://www.zillahschools.org/ZHS/) 
 Zillah also has an alternative school program  (http://www.zillahschools.org/ZAP)

A webpage includes the history of Zillah High School and beginnings of Zillah School District  (http://www.zillahschools.org/ZHS/zhshistory.htm).

References

External links
Zillah School District No. 205
Zillah School District Report Card
Zillah High School

School districts in Washington (state)
Education in Yakima County, Washington